Patna is a town and community development block in the eastern state of Odisha, India. The town is represented in the Odisha Legislative Assembly by the Patna constituency. In 2019 election Biju Janata Dal candidate Jagannath Naik, defeated BJP candidate Bhabani Sankar Nayak.

References

Cities and towns in Kendujhar district